Ilva is a genus of African planthoppers in the family Achilidae. There is one described species in Ilva, I. nigrosignata.

References

Further reading

 
 
 
 
 

Achilidae
Auchenorrhyncha genera
Monotypic Hemiptera genera